Tyke (1973 – August 20, 1994) was a female African bush elephant from Mozambique who performed with Circus International of Honolulu, Hawaii. On August 20, 1994, during a performance at the Neal Blaisdell Center, she killed her trainer, Allen Campbell, and seriously injured her groomer, Dallas Beckwith. Tyke then ran from the arena and through the streets of the Kakaʻako central business district for more than thirty minutes. Unable to calm the elephant, local police opened fire on the animal, which collapsed from the wounds and died. While the majority of the attack in the arena was recorded on consumer videotape by several spectators, additional professional video footage captured the attack on local publicist Steve Hirano and the shooting of Tyke herself (both of which took place outside of the building).

Background

Animal abuse
According to People for the Ethical Treatment of Animals (PETA), although the US Animal Welfare Act of 1966 does not permit any sort of punishment that puts the animals in discomfort, trainers will still go against this law and use such things as electric rods and bullhooks. According to PETA, during an undercover investigation of Carson & Barnes Circus, video footage was captured showing animal care director Tim Frisco training endangered Asian elephants with electrical shock prods and instructing other trainers to "beat the elephants with a bullhook as hard as they can and sink the sharp metal hook into the elephant's flesh and twist it until they scream in pain".

On behalf of the Ministry of Agriculture, Nature and Food Quality of the Netherlands, Wageningen University conducted an investigation into the welfare of circus animals in 2008. The following issues, among others, were found:

 71% of the observed animals had medical problems.
 Elephants are shackled in chains for 17 hours a day on average.
 Elephants spend on average 10 hours a day showing stereotypic behaviour.

Based on these findings, the researchers called for more stringent regulation regarding the welfare of circus animals. In 2012, the Dutch government announced a ban on the use of wild circus animals.

In testimony in U.S. District Court in 2009, Ringling Bros. and Barnum & Bailey Circus CEO Kenneth Feld acknowledged that circus elephants are struck behind the ears, under the chin and on their legs with metal tipped prods, called bullhooks. Feld stated that these practices are necessary to protect circus workers. Feld also acknowledged that an elephant trainer was reprimanded for using an electric shock device, known as a hot shot or electric prod, on an elephant, which Feld also stated was appropriate practice. Feld denied that any of these practices harm elephants. In its January 2010 verdict on the case, brought against Feld Entertainment International by the American Society for the Prevention of Cruelty to Animals et al., the Court ruled that evidence against the circus company was "not credible with regard to the allegations". In lieu of a USDA hearing, Feld Entertainment Inc. (parent of Ringling Bros.) agreed to pay an unprecedented $270,000 fine for violations of the Animal Welfare Act that allegedly occurred between June 2007 and August 2011.

A 14-year litigation against the Ringling Bros. and Barnum & Bailey Circus came to an end in 2014 when The Humane Society of the United States and a number of other animal rights groups paid a $16 million settlement to Feld Entertainment; however, the circus closed in May 2017 after a 146-year run when it experienced a steep decline in ticket sales a year after it discontinued its elephant act and sent its pachyderms to a reserve.

On 1 February 1992 at the Great American Circus in Palm Bay, Florida, an elephant named Janet (1965 – 1 February 1992) went out of control while giving a ride to a mother, her two children, and three other children. The elephant then stampeded through the circus grounds outside before being shot to death by police.

In December 2018, New Jersey became the first state in the U.S. to ban circuses, carnivals and fairs from featuring elephants, tigers, and other exotic animals.

Tyke lashes out
According to Tyrone Taylor, Tyke's responsible trainer at the time (interviewed in documentary film), Tyke had been involved in three incidents prior to the attack of August 1994.

April 21–22, 1993
On April 21, 1993, Tyke escaped through the front doors of the Altoona, Pennsylvania Jaffa Shrine Center during a performance, remaining untethered for an hour. The rampage caused more than $14,000 in damage. An affidavit obtained from a circus worker by the USDA the following day stated that Tyke had also attacked a tiger trainer, while the circus was in Altoona.

July 23, 1993
On July 23, 1993, Tyke "ran amok at the North Dakota State Fair in Minot, North Dakota, trampling and injuring a handler and frightening the crowd as [she] ran uncontrolled for 25 minutes".

According to USDA and Canadian law enforcement documents, while a Hawthorn elephant named Tyke (possibly the same Tyke involved in the four aforementioned incidents), was performing with Tarzan Zerbini Circus, "The elephant handler was observed beating the single-tusk African elephant in public to the point [where] the elephant was screaming and bending down on three legs to avoid being hit. Even when the handler walked by the elephant after this, the elephant screamed and veered away, demonstrating fear from his presence."

Casualties 

On August 20, 1994, during a performance at Circus International in Honolulu, Hawaii, Tyke trampled and critically injured her groomer, Dallas Beckwith, throwing him around numerous times in the process, before killing her trainer, Allen Campbell, who was knocked to the ground, dragged and crushed to death under Tyke's massive trunk after he attempted to save Beckwith from being trampled to death during the attack. She then charged out of the arena and onto the streets outside. She additionally attacked and nearly crushed publicist Steve Hirano, who tried to stop her from escaping from the circus parking lot. A nearby police officer seeing the attack fired multiple shots in the direction of the elephant, distracting her and causing her to flee away from Hirano. After a half-hour of chasing Tyke down, local police officers fired 86 shots at the 8,000-lb (3600 kg) elephant. Tyke finally collapsed from the numerous wounds and died.

Aftermath 
Following the Hawaii accident of August 20, 1994, Tyke became a symbol of circus tragedies and of animal rights. In the aftermath, lawsuits were filed against the City of Honolulu, the State of Hawaii, the circus, and Tyke's owner, John Cuneo Jr. and his Hawthorn Corp. Honolulu lawyer William Fenton Sink sued Cuneo on behalf of numerous plaintiffs, including young children, who suffered psychological trauma after witnessing Tyke's killing. While the lawsuits were settled out of court, the details of the monetary decision were kept sealed from publication. In honor of Sink's work in the Tyke case, Animal Rights Hawaii renamed its "Order of the Innocent Award", The William Fenton Sink Award for Defense of Animals.

Allen Campbell's autopsy revealed that he died from severe internal injuries, including major skull and chest fractures.

The Tyke incident inspired legislation on local levels in Hawaii and abroad, while California Congressman Sam Farr introduced legislation (HR2323) into the House of Representatives in 1999 and again in 2012.

In popular culture 
Christian thrash metal band Tourniquet, known for its stance against animal abuse, wrote the song "86 Bullets" about Tyke for their 2012 album Antiseptic Bloodbath.

Tyke is also seen on The History Channel show Shockwave, World's Most Amazing Videos, Banned from Television, and Maximum Exposure.

The Hawaii Five-O remake also mentions the Honolulu attack in Season 6, Episode 20 Ka Haunaele (Rampage).

Hard rock band 86 Bullets was named after the killing of Tyke, and have a song about the incident, "Hail of Bullets," that appears on their 2017 ep, "The Elephant in the Room."

See also 
 List of individual elephants
 Elephant attacks
 Topsy (elephant)
 Mary (elephant) 
 Chunee
 Rogue elephant of Aberdare Forest

References

External links 
 
 Sirkten Kaçıp Sokaklarda Koştururken 86 Kurşun Yiyen Fil "Tyke" nin Hikayesi 

1974 animal births
1994 animal deaths
1994 controversies in the United States
Animal cruelty incidents
Cruelty to animals
Elephant attacks
Politics of Hawaii
Individual elephants
Circus animals
Missing or escaped animals
Tyke
Filmed killings by law enforcement
Law enforcement controversies
Deaths by firearm in Hawaii
Animal rights
Animal rights movement
1994 in Hawaii
Individual animals in the United States
Elephants in the United States